Fasid is an Islamic religious concept meaning corruption.

In this context, it refers to corruption created by humans, as an embodiment of the 'Left Hand of Allah' (wrath) in relevance to tanzih (transcendence).

This corruption can only be wrought by humans, as they are made of clay, which can manifest darkness and evil.

The antonym of fasid is salih (wholesomeness) or salihat (wholesome deeds).

One manifestation of fasid is the human desire to control nature. Since nature, as with all things, is under the government of Allah, such an attempt becomes an act of insubordination and a rejection of Allah's Will.

References

External links
ف س د  at The Quranic Arabic Corpus

Allah
Islamic theology
Islamic terminology